"(Hey You) The Rock Steady Crew" is the debut single by American hip hop group the Rock Steady Crew from their debut studio album Ready for Battle. It was released in 1983 through Charisma/Virgin Records as the album's lead single. Written by Budd "Blue Soldier" Dixon, Ruza Blue and Stephen Hague, and produced by Dixon and Hague, the lead vocals were performed by 15 year old Daisy Castro, aka "Baby Love". The song became the most popular hit song of the Rock Steady Crew. The single peaked at number-one on the Belgian and Dutch singles charts, and also reached the top ten in many European countries, including the United Kingdom.

Charts

Sales and certifications

See also
 List of number-one hits of 1983 (Flanders)
 List of Dutch Top 40 number-one singles of 1983

References

External links

1983 songs
1983 debut singles
Dutch Top 40 number-one singles
Number-one singles in Belgium
Song recordings produced by Stephen Hague
Songs written by Stephen Hague
Virgin Records singles